The 2023 FIFA U-20 World Cup will be the 23rd edition of the FIFA U-20 World Cup, the biennial international men's youth football championship contested by the under-20 national teams of the member associations of FIFA, since its inception in 1977 as the FIFA World Youth Championship. It will be hosted by Indonesia, which will be the first FIFA tournament hosted by the country.

Indonesia was originally due to host the tournament in 2021, but the COVID-19 pandemic forced FIFA to cancel the tournament, who awarded the 2023 hosting rights to the country on 24 December 2020.

Ukraine, the 2019 champions, were not able to defend their title as they failed to reach the final round of the UEFA qualifying tournament. In doing so, they became the seventh consecutive title holders to fail to qualify for the subsequent tournament.

Host selection

Five bids to host the original 2021 tournament were submitted in 2019, and Indonesia was announced as the winning bidder on 24 October 2019.

After the 2021 tournament was cancelled, it was decided on 24 December 2020 to award the 2023 hosting rights to Indonesia.

Qualified teams
A total of 24 teams qualified for the final tournament. In addition to Indonesia which automatically qualified as hosts – their first qualification to a FIFA tournament since the 1979 FIFA World Youth Championship and only its second ever qualification for a FIFA tournament, 23 other teams qualified from six separate continental competitions.

The Dominican Republic and Israel will make their debut in the competition. This is the Dominican Republic's first ever qualification for a FIFA tournament. Having qualified for the 1970 FIFA World Cup via the Asian qualification, this will be the first FIFA tournament for which Israel has qualified as a European representative.

Venues
In June 2020, the Football Association of Indonesia (PSSI) announced six venues intended for the 2021 FIFA U-20 World Cup, which at the time was put on hold by FIFA.

Draw
The draw will be held on 31 March 2023, at the Taman Werdhi Budaya Art Centre in Denpasar, Bali.

The 24 teams will be drawn into six groups of four teams, with the hosts Indonesia automatically seeded to Pot 1 and placed into the first position of Group A, while the remaining teams were seeded into their respective pots based on their results in the last five FIFA U-20 World Cups (more recent tournaments weighted more heavily), with bonus points awarded to confederation champions.

The draw will start with the host Indonesia to A1, the teams from Pot 1 will be drawn first, the teams from Pots 2, 3 and 4 need to skip groups to avoid geographical clash and there will be no 2 teams to play from the same confederation, then the draw will conclude with teams from Pot 4. Due to Israel's lack of diplomatic recognition with Indonesia and Iraq, they can't be drawn with each other.

Squads

Players born on or after 1 January 2003 and on or before 31 December 2007 will be eligible to compete in the tournament.

Each team must name a preliminary squad of between 22 and 50 players. From the preliminary squad, the team will name a final squad of 21 players (three of whom must be goalkeepers) by the FIFA deadline. Players in the final squad can be replaced by a player from the preliminary squad due to serious injury or illness up to 24 hours prior to kickoff of the team's first match.

Group stage

Group A

Group B

Group C

Group D

Group E

Group F

Ranking of third-placed teams
The four best third-placed teams from the six groups advance to the knockout stage along with the six group winners and six runners-up.

In the next stage the four third-placed teams will be matched with the winners of groups A, B, C, and D according to the tournament regulations.

Knockout stage
In the knockout stage, if a match is level at the end of 90 minutes of normal playing time, extra time will be played (two periods of 15 minutes each), where each team is allowed to make a fourth substitution. If still tied after extra time, the match will be decided by a penalty shoot-out to determine the winner.

In the round of 16, the four third-placed teams will be matched with the winners of groups A, B, C, and D. The specific match-ups involving the third-placed teams depend on which four third-placed teams qualified for the round of 16:

Bracket

Round of 16

Quarter-finals

Semi-finals

Third place play-off

Final

Marketing

Development and preparation
After being awarded hosts of the 2021 FIFA U-20 World Cup, the government of Indonesia formed the tournament's organizing committee (Indonesia FIFA U-20 World Cup Organizing Committee, or "INAFOC"). Indonesian president Joko Widodo appointed Minister of Youth and Sports Zainudin Amali as the committee's chair.

On 17 August 2022, coincided with the country's 77th anniversary of independence, FIFA unveiled the tournament's emblem on its streaming service FIFA+.

Broadcasting rights

The following companies held the broadcasting rights:

Sponsorship

Adidas

BRI
Klikdaily
Indofood
Samsung
Telkomsel
Mengniu Dairy
Danone
Glico

Symbols

Mascot
The official mascot, a Javan rhinoceros named "Bacuya", acronym of "Badak Cula Cahaya" or light-horned rhinoceros was launched on 18 September 2022.

Controversies
By finishing second in the 2022 UEFA European Under-19 Championship, this marked Israel's first ever participation at the U-20 World Cup in the history. However, Israel's participation is subjected to political controversies due to Indonesia having the world's largest Muslim population and the two countries having no formal relations owing to the ongoing Israeli–Palestinian conflict. Given this, Indonesian Minister of Youth and Sports Zainudin Amali stated that FIFA required any country qualified for the U-20 World Cup shall play, and that the local security officers will provide security for the Israeli team.

Despite attempts to confirm Israel's participation, Israel's involvement has led to Indonesia under scrutiny by various pro-Palestinian organisations. Indonesian Islamic fundamentalist media have accused Israel of damaging Palestine's relations with Indonesia by qualifying to the U-20 World Cup; with some even demanded Israel to be expelled or withdrawn from the tournament. Various Islamist organisations in Indonesia have made its words by threatening Israeli players, stating that Israel team is not welcomed in Indonesia. By far, only Bali, where most population are Hindus, appear likely to welcome Israel, while discussion about Israel's participation remains to be seen, partly due to repeated threats against Israeli footballers.

References

External links

 
2023
2023 in youth association football
2023 in Indonesian football
2023 Fifa U-20 World Cup
Scheduled association football competitions
May 2023 sports events in Asia
June 2023 sports events in Asia
Sports events affected by the 2022 Russian invasion of Ukraine